Cerionidae is a family of air-breathing land snails, terrestrial pulmonate gastropod mollusks in the superfamily Urocoptoidea.

Pre-2008 taxonomy 
According to the taxonomy of the Gastropoda by Bouchet & Rocroi, 2005), the family Cerionidae is classified in the superfamily Orthalicoidea, within the informal group Sigmurethra, itself belonging to the clade Stylommatophora within the clade Eupulmonata. The family Cerionidae has no subfamilies.

2008 taxonomy 
Uit de Weerd (2008) moved the Cerionidae to the newly established superfamily Urocoptoidea based on molecular phylogeny research.

Fossil record
The oldest fossil cerionid is C. acherontis from the Upper Cretaceous Hell Creek Formation, in Montana, northwestern USA. The second oldest record is the genus Brasilennea from the Brazilian Paleocene Itaboraí Basin, in Rio de Janeiro.

Genera 
Genera within the Cerionidae include:

 Brasilennea Maury, 1935
 Cerion Röding, 1798 - the type genus of the family Cerionidae
 Mexistrophia Thompson, 2011

References

External links 
 

 
Gastropod families